3rd Album Part A: Peace Love & Ice Cream is the third Korean studio album by pop/rock singer Younha, released on April 16, 2009.  This album introduced a cuter, more girly image of Younha, as evidenced by the album's cover and music video for the first single off the album, "1,2,3".

Track listing
 "Peace Love & Ice Cream" (Bart Voncken, Tony Cornelissen) - 3:14
 "Black Rain" - 0:41
 "Break Out" (Fredrik Hult, Shusui Kosugi, Tebey) - 4:05
 "1,2,3" (Fredrik Hult, Shusui Kosugi, Carl Utbult, Vince Degiorgio) - 3:27
 "She is" (Younha) - 2:05
 "사랑하다" (Saranghada, "Loves") (심재희, Younha) - 3:30
 "Luv U Luv U Luv U" (이숲, 이관) - 3:09
 "My Song and... (Korean Ver.)" (이숲, 김보민) - 3:22
 "1,2,3 (Instrumental)" - 3:27
 "사랑하다 (Instrumental)" - 3:30

Notes

References

External links
 Younha Official Website (Korean language)

2009 albums
Younha albums
Genie Music albums